Cassia tomentella, the velvet bean tree, is a species of flowering plant in the family Fabaceae, native to Queensland. It is used as a street tree in Brisbane.

References

tomentella
Endemic flora of Queensland
Plants described in 1926